Briand Fjord is a bay nearly  long in the northeast part of Flandres Bay, along the west coast of Graham Land. It was charted by the French Antarctic Expedition, 1903–05, and named by Jean-Baptiste Charcot for Aristide Briand, a French statesman who was Minister of Public Instruction in 1906.

Bayet Peak overlooks the south shore of the fjord.

References 

Bays of Graham Land
Danco Coast